"Cookie Jar" is the second single from the Gym Class Heroes album, The Quilt. The song features The-Dream singing the chorus with Travis McCoy. It was released on July 8, 2008 on the Patches from the Quilt - EP. "Cookie Jar" peaked at number 59 on the Billboard Hot 100. Outside of the United States, "Cookie Jar" peaked within the top ten of the charts in the United Kingdom.

Premise
The song was written by lead singer Travis McCoy during his year-long relationship with Katy Perry, to describe the temptations a man in a relationship is offered, using the idea of various types of cookie in a reachable jar as an analogy. Guitarist Disashi Lumumba-Kasongo described the song as being based:

"on the kind of dilemma that many guys have, like, they find a girl and then they're like, 'Oh, but I can have this one; it would be so much better.' Then they go to the other girl and they’re like, 'No. ... but I think this would be better.' The lyrics are based on the dilemma of trying to find the girl that makes you feel happy and having trouble with that."

Music video
The video premiered on FNMTV on August 15, 2008.
The music video has five different scenes. The first scene shows them in a room with blaring lights in the background. The second shows them in a white room singing to the camera. Third, is where the lead singer, Travis McCoy, is in a room with a woman who is supposed to be his girlfriend. Travis is in a room where he is sitting by a cookie jar which is the fourth scene. The fifth scene features Travis again where he is in a room with a greyish background.

The music video has also appeared on the MTV show The Base Chart Show.

Chart performance
In the United States, "Cookie Jar" peaked at number fifty nine on the Billboard Hot 100.

In the United Kingdom, "Cookie Jar" debuted at number 16 on the UK Singles Chart on September 7, 2008 – for the week ending September 13, 2008 – solely on downloads. The song and went on to peak at number six on the chart on September 21, 2008 – for the week ending date September 27, 2008 – becoming Gym Class Hero's third top ten song in Britain at that time following "Cupid's Chokehold" in May 2007 and "Clothes Off!!" in August 2007.

In Australia, "Cookie Jar" debuted at number 50 on ARIA Charts on September 22, 2008 – for the week ending September 28, 2008 – and remained there the next week. During its fourth week on the chart, it ascended to number 44, and in its fifth week, ascended to its peak position of number 41.

Charts

Weekly charts

Year-end charts

Certifications

References

2008 singles
Gym Class Heroes songs
The-Dream songs
Songs written by The-Dream
Song recordings produced by Tricky Stewart
2008 songs
Songs about infidelity